The Miss Tierra República Dominicana 2005 beauty pageant was held in the Dominican Republic. This year, 25 candidates competed for the national crown. The winner represented the Dominican Republic at the Miss Earth 2005, which was held in Manila.

Results
Miss Tierra República Dominicana 2005 : Amell Yoselín Santana de Jesús (Hato Mayor)
1st Runner Up : Mariela Zamora (Vílla Bisonó)
2nd Runner Up  : Carina Sousa (Neiba)
3rd Runner Up  : Ana Hidalgo (Santiago)
4th Runner Up  : Sandra Montas (San Pedro de Macorís)

Top 12

Jelite Zamora (San Francisco de Macorís)
Inelkis Ramos (La Romana)
Mayra Rosario (Moca)
Nidez de Paula (Com. Dom. Nueva York)
Aura Castros (Puerto Plata)
Morena Ruiz (Monte Cristi)
Diana Santos (Valverde)

Special awards
 Miss Photogenic (voted by press reporters) - Tatiana Rojas (Salvaleón de Higüey)
 Miss Congeniality (voted by contestants) - Isaura Reynosa (Bonao)
 Best Face - Amell Santana (Hato Mayor)
 Best Provincial Costume - Casandra Mota (Santiago Rodríguez)
 Miss Cultura - Cesarina Ynoa (Com. Dom. Puerto Rico)
 Miss Elegancia - Mili de la Rosa (Azua)

Delegates

Miss Dominican Republic
2005 beauty pageants
2005 in the Dominican Republic